S for Sex, S for Secret is a 2015 Hong Kong comedy film. It was released on 15 January 2015.

Cast
Annie Liu
Pakho Chau
Jacquelin Chong
Philip Keung
Jeana Ho
Kabby Hui
Edward Ma
Bryant Mak
Bob Lam
Elva Ni
Winki Lai
Jessica Cambensy

Reception
The film has earned HK$2.33 million at the Hong Kong box office. It received negative reviews from South China Morning Post, which gave it one star out of five.

References

External links

2015 comedy films
Hong Kong comedy films
Films directed by Patrick Kong
2010s Hong Kong films
2010s Cantonese-language films